WEF stands for the World Economic Forum,  a Geneva-based foundation that holds meetings of world economic leaders.

WEF may also refer to:

 WEF, IATA code for Weifang Airport, Shandong, China
 Water Environment Federation, a worldwide organization of engineers and industry related to water use
 World Education Forum, association of bodies involved in education